"Bayatılar" is a song by Azerbaijani musician Eldar Mansurov with lyrics by Vahid Aziz. It was released in 1989 by Brilliant Dadashova in Azerbaijan, Russia, Turkey, Turkmenistan, Europe, the Arab world and Brazil.

Versions and samplings
"Bayatılar" has been covered, interpolated and sampled in songs by many other artists, such as in the following:

1990: Ashkhabad - "Bayaty" (Turkmenistan)
1990: Reno - "Zdrastvuy" (Russia)
1995: Sezen Aksu - "Zalim" (Turkey)
1995: Levent Yüksel - "Zalim" (Turkey) - cover of Sezen Aksu's "Zalim"
1995: Petros Dourdoumpakis - "Taxidiariko Pouli" (Greece)
1997: Dimitra Galani - "Oses Foties" (Greece)
1998: Monica Salmaso - "Bayatı" (Brazil)
2002: Grinsteins Mischpoche - "Bayatı" (Germany)
2003: Katy Garbi - "Esena Mono" (Greece)
2003: Vasilis Lekkas - "Taxidiariko Pouli" (Greece)
2004: Dino Merlin - "Subota" (Bosnia and Herzegovina)
2005: Seray Sever - "İçim yanıyor" (Turkey)
2006: Dilek Budak - "Adını Yıldızlara" (Turkey)
2006: Ziyoda - "Yollarim" (Uzbekistan)
2006: Lachyn Mammedowa - "Yalnyz yuregim" (Turkmenistan)
2006: Aygun Kazimova - "Bayatılar" (Azerbaijan)
2006: Hüseyn Karadayı and DJ Funky C - "Miracles" (Turkey) - based on Levent Yüksel's "Zalim"
2006: DJ Pantelis - "I Have a Dream" (Greece) - based on Levent Yüksel's "Zalim"
2007: Çalar Saat - "Zalim" (Turkey) - cover of Sezen Aksu's "Zalim"
2008: Milad və Mohammad - "Are Faghat To" (Iran)
2008: Brilliant Dadashova - "Bayatılar Remix" (Azerbaijan)
2009: Edward Maya and Vika Jigulina - "Stereo Love" (Romania)
2010: Edward Maya and Mia Martina - "Stereo Love" (Canada) - cover of Edward Maya and Vika Jigulina's "Stereo Love"
2010: PJ feat. Velvet - "Stereo Love" (Sweden) - cover of Edward Maya and Vika Jigulina's "Stereo Love"
2010: Ivan Zak - "Dečko sa Balkana (Stereo Love)" (Croatia) - cover of Edward Maya and Vika Jigulina's "Stereo Love"
2010: Cantodiscanto - "Bayati" (Italy)
2010: The Guzek Trio - "Bayati" (UK)
2010: Benjamim Taubkin - "Bayaty" (Brazil)
2012: Saltanath - "Zalim" (Turkey) - cover of Sezen Aksu's "Zalim"
2012: Aydan Kaya - "Zalim" (Turkey) - cover of Sezen Aksu's "Zalim"
2012: Matthaios Tsahouridis - "Zalim/Bayatilar" (Greece)
2013: Bengü - "Zalim" (Turkey) - cover of Sezen Aksu's "Zalim"
2013: Babbe Rabbe - "Bayatilar" (Israel)
2014: Dobranotch - "Bayatilar" (Russia)
2014: Abash - "Bayati" (Italy)
2019: Drenchill - "Never, Never" (Portugal)
2020: Why So Sad - "Out of Time" (Germany)

References

1989 songs
1989 singles
Azerbaijani songs